Neocollyris bonellii is a species of ground beetle in the genus Neocollyris in the family Carabidae. It was described by Félix Édouard Guérin-Méneville in 1834.

References

Bonellii, Neocollyris
Beetles described in 1834